Brief & Trunks (Japanese ブリーフ&トランクス) are a J-pop comedy duo that were originally active from 1993–2000, consisting of Takayuki Itou (伊藤多賀之) on vocals and guitar, and Makoto Hosone (細根誠) on vocals, who first met as students of a Shizuoka Prefecture high school. They released 12 singles, 12 albums and 4 videos, including their signature song "Konbini (Convenience Store)". 

The duo disbanded on December 31, 2000. Itou continued activity in the independent music field. They reunited in 2016.

Discography

Singles 
 Sanadamushi (May 21, 1998)
 Futari No Himitsu (August 5, 1998)
 Aonori (November 6, 1998)
 Ensoku (March 3, 1999)
 Hitori No Uta (August 25, 1999)
 Kombini (November 20, 1999)
Ishiyaki Imo (January 21, 2000)
 Pechapai (April 21, 2000)
 Kenryoku Honey 〜Summer Version〜 (July 26, 2000)
Puchipuchi 〜Differ Version〜 (October 4, 2000)
 Golden Ball (July 11, 2012)
 Meramera Scream (June 4, 2014)

Albums 
 Buritora (June 3, 1998)
 Sengo Saidai No Harmony (November 21, 1998)
 Bokura No Ekisu (September 1, 1999)
 Buritora No Hanran (May 1, 2000)
 BURITORA GOLDEN BEST (December 6, 2000)
 Goodjob, Baby (May 22, 2013)
 Buritora Dochu Hizakurige (March 25, 2015)
 Buritora Izonsho (March 2, 2016)
 Tenohira Wo Mangetsu Ni (May 17, 2017)
 BURITORA BEST BIBLE (March 21, 2018)
BURITORA BEST BIBLE I
BURITORA BEST BIBLE II
 Buritora Maizokin (May 22, 2019)
 Papepipuperopero (September 23, 2020)

References

Folk music groups
Japanese pop music groups
Musical groups from Shizuoka Prefecture